Chatmohar is an upazila of Pabna District in the Division of Rajshahi, Bangladesh.

Geography
It has 39489 households and a total area of 314.32 km2.

Demographics
As of the 2011 Bangladesh census, Chatmohar has a population of 291,121. Males constitute 50.63% of the population, and females 49.37%.The density of the population is 938.8 inhabitants/km2. Chatmohar has an average literacy rate of 43.4% (7+ years), while the national average is 32.4%.

Administration
Chatmohar Upazila is divided into Chatmohar Municipality and 11 union parishads: Bilchalan, Chhaikhola, Danthia Bamangram, Failjana, Gunaigachha, Handial, Haripur, Mothurapur, Mulgram, Nimaichara, and Parshadanga. The union parishads are subdivided into 170 mauzas and 236 villages.

Chatmohar Municipality is subdivided into 9 wards and 13 mahallas.

Chairman: Abdul Hamid Master

Vice Chairman: Aroj Khan

Woman Vice Chairman: Sufiya Khatun

Upazila Nirbahi Officer (UNO): Sheheli Laila

Education

Primary Schools:
Afrat Para Govt. Primary School
Chatmohar Model Primary School
D A Joyen Uddin School
 Bahadurpur Government Primary School
Schools:
Ashraf Zindani High School, Shomaj
Mohela BL High School
Chatmohar RCN and BSN High School
Handiyal High School
Mulgram Union High School
Parshawdanga High School
Bamongram High School
Nimaichora High School
Chatmohar Model High School
Chatmohar Pilot Girls High School
Chiknai High School
Atlongka High School
Saint Rita's High School
Failjana High School
Panchuria high School
Chaikola High School
Chalanbill High School
Paramount International School

Colleges:
Chatmohar Degree College
Chatmohar Women's College
Chatmohar Technical and Business Management Institute
Atlongka Degree College
Handiyal College
M.A Samad BM School And College
Chaikhola Degree College
Professor Boyen Uddin Degree College
Mirzapur Degree College
Mahmud Ali Degree College

Madrashas:
Enayet ullah Fazil Madrasa
Samad Sawda Dhakhil Madrasha
Boyaiimary Dhakhil Madrasha
Kuabashi Dakhil Madrasah
 
Polytechnic institutes:
Chatmohar Polytechnic Institute

Notable residents
 General Joyanto Nath Chaudhuri OBE was Chief of Army Staff of the Indian Army (1962–1966)
 Pramatha Chaudhuri, writer, spent his first five years at Haripur village.
 K. M. Anowarul Islam was Member of Parliament for constituency Pabna-3 from 2001 until 2008.

See also
Upazilas of Bangladesh
Districts of Bangladesh
Divisions of Bangladesh

References

 
Upazilas of Pabna District